Spyridium riparium is a species of flowering plant in the family Rhamnaceae and is endemic to the south of Western Australia. It is an erect shrub, usually with narrowly egg-shaped leaves, and clusters of densely hairy, white or cream-coloured flowers.

Description
The edges of the leaves are rolled under, the upper surface is more or less glabrous and the lower surface white to pale green and densely hairy. Flowering occurs from July to October.

Taxonomy
Spyridium riparium was first formally described in 1995 by Barbara Lynette Rye in the journal Nuytsia from specimens collected by Belinda Hammersley, near the Mitchell River in 1993. The specific epithet (riparium) means "inhabiting river banks".

Distribution and habitat
This spyridium grows along river banks and near streams in sandy or gravelly soils between the Mitchell and Kent Rivers in the Esperance Plains, Jarrah Forest and Warren bioregions of southern Western Australia.

Conservation status
Spyridium riparium is listed as "Priority Two" by the Western Australian Government Department of Biodiversity, Conservation and Attractions, meaning that it is poorly known and from only one or a few locations.

References

riparium
Rosales of Australia
Flora of Western Australia
Plants described in 1995
Taxa named by Barbara Lynette Rye